Kasimir Romuald Graff (7 February 1878 – 15 February 1950) was a Polish-German astronomer. He worked as an assistant at the Hamburg Observatory and became a professor at Hamburg in 1916. In 1928 he became director of the Vienna Observatory, Austria. When the Nazi government took over in Austria in 1938, he was forced to retire. It is likely that his family background and his rejection of the Nazi-supported philosophy of "Welteislehre" was the reason, although he officially was removed because of unproven charges of embezzlement. He was reinstated in 1945, and he retired in 1949.

Using a 60 cm telescope, he was very adept in creating planetary maps from visual observations.

He also worked on measuring radiation emitted from stars, and invented and built new instrumentation for this purpose. This included new types of calorimeter and photometer detectors.

Honors 
 The lunar crater Graff, as well as Martian crater Graff are named after him.

References 

1878 births
1950 deaths
20th-century German astronomers
Member of the Tomasz Zan Society